This list of sequenced eubacterial genomes contains most of the eubacteria known to have publicly available complete genome sequences. Most of these sequences have been placed in the International Nucleotide Sequence Database Collaboration, a public database which can be searched on the web. A few of the listed genomes may not be in the INSDC database, but in other public databases.

Genomes listed as "Unpublished" are in a database, but not in the peer-reviewed scientific literature.

For the genomes of archaea see list of sequenced archaeal genomes.

Abditibacteriota

Actinomycetota

Aquificota

Armatimonadota

Bacteroidota/Chlorobiota group

Caldisericota

Chlamydiota/Verrucomicrobiota group

Chloroflexota

Chrysiogenota

Cyanobacteria

Deferribacterota

Deinococcota

Dictyoglomota

Elusimicrobiota

Fibrobacterota/Acidobacteriota group

Bacillota

Fusobacteriota

Gemmatimonadota

Nitrospirota

Planctomycetota

Pseudomonadota

Alphaproteobacteria

Betaproteobacteria

Gammaproteobacteria

Zetaproteobacteria

Myxococcota–Campylobacterota

Spirochaetota

Synergistota

Mycoplasmatota

Thermodesulfobacteriota

Thermotogota

See also 
 Genome project
 Human microbiome project
 List of sequenced eukaryotic genomes
 List of sequenced archaeal genomes
 List of sequenced plastomes

References 

In silico analysis of complete bacterial genomes: PCR, AFLP–PCR and endonuclease restriction 
Combining diverse evidence for gene recognition in completely sequenced bacterial genomes 
Intragenomic heterogeneity between multiple 16S ribosomal RNA operons in sequenced bacterial genomes

External links 

 BacMap — an up-to-date electronic atlas of annotated bacterial genomes
 SUPERFAMILY comparative genomics database Includes genomes of completely sequenced prokaryotes, and sophisticated datamining plus visualisation tools for analysis

Bacterial genomes
Bacterial genomes